The Owens Corning AttiCat 300 was a NASCAR Xfinity Series standalone race held in the summer at Chicagoland Speedway in Joliet, Illinois. It replaced the race at Gateway International Raceway as a part of the 2011 changes to the series schedule. The race was replaced with a race at Pocono Raceway for the 2016 season.

Past winners

2012: Race extended due to a green–white–checker finish.
2015: Race postponed from Saturday night to Sunday due to rain and thunderstorm.

Manufacturer wins

References

External links
 

Former NASCAR races
NASCAR Xfinity Series races
2011 establishments in Illinois
2015 disestablishments in Illinois
 
Recurring sporting events established in 2011
Recurring sporting events disestablished in 2015